Vaine Kino is a former professional rugby league and rugby union footballer who played in the 2000s and 2010s. He played representative level rugby league (RL) for Cook Islands, and at club level for the Sydney Bulls.

Rugby league career
Kino won a cap for Cook Islands in the 2000 Rugby League World Cup.

Kino later played for the Sydney Bulls in the Metropolitan Cup, kicking a field goal to ensure the Bulls won their first ever title.

Rugby union career
As of 2010, Kino played rugby union in New South Wales.

References

External links
Kiwis looking for second win

Cook Islands national rugby league team players
Cook Island rugby league players
Place of birth missing (living people)
Year of birth missing (living people)
Living people
Sydney Bulls players
Cook Island expatriate rugby union players
Cook Island expatriate rugby league players
Expatriate rugby league players in Australia
Expatriate rugby union players in Australia
Cook Island expatriates in Australia